Gaeltacht na nDéise is a Gaeltacht area in County Waterford consisting of the areas of Ring and Old Parish. It is located 10 km from the town of Dungarvan. Gaeltacht na nDéise has a population of 1,816 people (Census 2016) and encompasses a geographical area of 62 km2. This represents 1% of total Gaeltacht area.

Irish language 
The use of the Irish language in the Gaeltacht is tracked at each census. Figures for the use of Irish in Gaeltacht na nDéise are as follows.

Gaeltacht na nDéise is one of the few Gaeltacht areas to have increased its number of daily Irish speakers in census 2016.

Research into the status of the language in the area is carried out from time to time. The last such survey of the area was carried out in May 2006. Given the small population of the area, a full population survey was carried out. The research was carried out on behalf of the local development company, Comhlucht Forbartha na nDéise, by a team from Cork Institute of Technology. Over one quarter (29.7%) of households were found to use Irish as the principal home language, over two thirds (68.6%) were principally English speaking while a small minority (0.5%) another language was the principal language of the home. More than six-sevenths (86.3%) of respondents reported the ability to speak Irish, 13.7% reported that they are unable to speak Irish. Of those who speak Irish, well over three quarters speak Irish at home, with over half (53.5%) speaking Irish at home on a daily basis. Over one third of those claiming the ability to speak Irish reported speaking Irish at work and with friends on a daily basis. When asked if they wished to retain their status as a Gaeltacht area, the residence of Gaeltacht na nDéise gave a nearly unanimous response with 98% in favour.

Language planning 
Acht na Gaeltachta 2012 has set out a language planning process that will be undertaken in 26 Language Planning Areas throughout the Gaeltach, as set out by The Department of Arts, Heritage and the Gaeltacht. Gaeltacht na nDéise constitutes a single Language Planning Area under the act. A 'Ceanneagraíocht' or lead-organisation is selected by Údarás na Gaeltachta to develop a language plan aimed at increasing the use of Irish in their community. Comhlucht Forbartha na nDéise was selected by Údarás na Gaeltachta as the lead-organisation for Gaeltacht na nDéise. As such, Comhlucht Forbartha na nDéise had two years to develop a seven-year language plan for the area.

Economy

Commerce and employment
Commercial fishing from the local fishing pier or Cé Heilbhic and Agriculture are sources of employment and economic activity in the area, though the importance of both has declined in recent years. Education is also a source of employment in both publicly and privately funded. Electronic manufacturing and the televisual sector which supplies TG4 and the international market are also contributors to the local economy. In 2011 there were 121 people employed in a full-time capacity in Údarás na Gaeltachta client companies in the Waterford Gaeltacht. By 2019, 149 people were employed full time in client companies of Údarás na Gaeltachta in the Waterford Gaeltacht. The area is somewhat disadvantaged, with a higher unemployment rate than the national average. There is a disparity between Ring and Old Parish in terms of economic development with Old Parish being at a lower level of economic development.

Tourism sites 

Tourism is an important part of the local economy in Gaeltacht na nDéise. Sites in the area include Reilig an tSléibhe, a famine graveyard located in An Seanphobal. Dating from the Great Famine, there are possibly 3 mass graves in the field that were used to cope with the large numbers and as the deaths declined, it is believed single graves were dug. In 1995, for the 150th commemoration of the famine, a memorial was created which was inscribed with part of Máire Ní Dhroma's poem, Na Prátaí Dubha. Also to be seen at the site is a solitary sculpted figure in mourning, at the side of the field. This sculpture was created by Seán Creagh; he died before it was complete and so the fibreglass structure that would have been used to create the mould for the final piece was erected instead. None of the graves at the site are marked in any way. Within the field there is, however, a headstone where G. R. Jacobs from the HMT Bradford is buried. He died at sea in 1916.

Tourism development 

Comhlucht Forbartha na nDéise commissioned a report into Cultural Tourism in Gaeltacht na nDéise in 2014. This report was part of a wider tourism development project in the Gaeltacht that was largely funded by Waterford Leader Partnership. The study was undertaken by Dungarvan-based HandsOnEvents. The report found that significant cultural tourism development potential exists in the area due to the natural environment of the area, its cultural richness in terms of language, music and the arts, built heritage combined with the considerable enthusiasm by the local community.

As a result of this, a new tourism development committee, An Coiste Fáilte, which is a sub-committee of Comhlucht Forbartha na nDéise has recently been established in the area. The purpose of An Coiste Fáilte is to develop and enhance the area for both locals and tourists alike, and to focus primarily on the Irish Language, Culture and History of the area. This will ensure the sustainability of the area and preserve the history and traditions for future generations to come. Projects undertaken by this group include the development of Reilig an tSléibhe, the local Famine Graveyard, Aonach an Phátrúin, a Christmas Market organised on the Patron Saint's day in the area and the development of the areas presence as part of the new Ireland's Ancient East initiative.

Townlands 
The Gaeltacht area is defined by the townlands that are deemed to be part of that Gaeltacht, Gaeltacht na nDéise was defined in the Gaeltacht Areas Order, 1956 and expanded in Gaeltacht Areas Order, 1974. Below is the list of townlands that currently constitute Gaeltacht na nDéise.

Áthán, Baile an Róid, Baile an tSléibhe Thuaidh, Baile an tSléibhe Theas, Baile Uí Churraoin Thuaidh, Baile Uí Churraoin Theas, Baile Mhic Giolla Mhuire, Baile Mhac Airt Íochtarach, Baile Mhac Airt Uachtarach, Baile na Cúirte Thuaidh, Baile na Cúirte Theas, Baile na nGall Beag, Baile na nGall Mór, Baile na hArda, Baile na Móna Íochtarach, Baile na Móna Uachtarach, Baile Uí Raghallaigh, Baile Threasnáin, Barr na Léithe, Barr na Stuac, An Carraigín, An Chúil Rua, Cruabhaile Íochtarach, Cruabhaile Uachtarach, An Coinigéar, An Fhaiche, Fearann an Lóintigh, Na Geataí, Gleann an Fhíoruisce, An Goirtín, Gort na Daibhche Íochtarach, Gort na Daibhche Uachtarach, An Gabhlán, Sliabh an Ghabhláin, Baile an Aicéadaigh, Heilbhic, Cill Cholmáin, Cill an Fhuarthainn, Cnocán an Phaoraigh Íochtarach, Cnocán an Phaoraigh Uachtarach, An Cnocán Rua, Cnoc an Fhréinigh, Cnoc na gCapall, Log na Giumhaisí, An Léith, Loiscreán, An Mhóin Bhreac, An Mhóin Fhionn, An Móta, Móin an Ghiumhais, Móin na mBian, Móin na mBráthar, Móin an Fhia, Maoil an Choirnigh, Ráth Léad, Ráth na mBiníneach, An Ré Dhóite, An Ré Mheánach, Ré na gCloichín, Ré na gCuilí, Na Roisíní, An Scardán, An Screathan, Seanchluain, An tSeanchill, An Seanbhaile.

References 

Gaeltacht places in County Waterford